Abu Nu'aym Mu'awiya ibn Hudayj ibn Jafna ibn Qatira al-Sakuni al-Tujibi al-Kindi , was a general of the Kindah tribe under Muawiyah I in Ifriqiya. Mu'awiyah ibn Hudayj participated in the Early Muslim conquests against Byzantines in Levant, Sicily and Ifriqiya, and also against Sasanian Empire in the Battle of al-Qādisiyyah.

Biography 
He participated in the Battle of Yarmuk, the Battle of al-Qādisiyyah, and the Battle of Jalula. 

According to Ali ibn al-Athir in his Usd al-ghabah fi marifat al-Saḥabah, Mu'awiyah ibn Hudayj participated in the Muslim conquest of North Africa under Abdallah ibn Sa'd  against the Berbers. Ibn Hudayj continued to serve under Abdullah ibn Abi Sarh during the siege of Dongola, capital of Makuria kingdom. During this battle, Ibn Hudayj lost one of his eye. Later in the year of 44 AH (664-665 AD), Ibn Hudayj launched a sudden attack towards island of Sicily. Ibn Hudayj brought two hundred ships during this invasion which was prepared by his superior, Mu'awiyah. Ibn Hudayj managed to seized massive spoils of war from this campaign, when he returned to Levant in 645 AD. According to Al-Baladhuri, He invaded the island of Sicily on the authority of Mu'awiyah ibn Abi Sufyan, and the first Muslim commander to infest the island. 

After the first invasion, Ibn Hudayj continued to raid the island routinely for the rest of Muslim conquest.

He led 10,000 troops in the area of Sousse (Hadrumetum).

After the Siege of Uthman and Uthman's death, Ibn Hudayj called for retribution. In 658, he killed Muhammad ibn Abi Bakr. 

He garrisoned troops in the Kairouan area (654-665) and conducted operations against Hadrumetum in the Tacape (Lesser Syrtis) region. He would conduct raids on Sicily in 44 AH (666). He was made the governor of Barqah (Cyrenaica) in 47 AH (669).

Ibn Taghribirdi, Ibn al-Athir and al-Tabari all record a story that Ibn Hudayj blocked the appointment of Ibn Umm al-Hakam as governor of Egypt in 678, although he was long dead by that time.

See also
 History of Islamic Tripolitania and Cyrenaica

References

Bibliography 
 
 
 
 

Arab generals
670 deaths
Year of birth unknown
Year of death uncertain
Generals of the Umayyad Caliphate
Governors of the Umayyad Caliphate
Arab people of the Arab–Byzantine wars
7th-century rulers in Africa
7th-century Arabs
Kinda